Bartholomew "Bertie" or "Bart" McGhee (April 30, 1899 – January 26, 1979) was an American soccer forward who typically played left wing forward. He played for the United States men's national soccer team at the 1930 FIFA World Cup, and scored the second goal in World Cup history against Belgium. He was inducted into the U.S. National Soccer Hall of Fame in 1986.

Youth
McGhee was the son of former Hibernian player and Heart of Midlothian manager James McGhee, and the brother of Philadelphia Field Club forward Jimmy McGhee.  McGhee's father was a renowned Scottish player who appeared with Scotland in an 1886 game with Wales.  McGhee's father had a controversial term as the manager of Hearts.  When he finally resigned on December 6, 1909, he began assessing his options.  In September 1910 he decided to leave Scotland and emigrate to the United States.  It took Jimmy McGhee two years to get settled and it was not until 1912 that McGhee, his mother and younger brother Jimmy joined his father in the U.S.  When they arrived in the U.S., the family settled in Philadelphia, Pennsylvania.

Playing

Amateur
When he was nineteen, McGhee  began playing for New York Shipbuilding, located in Camden, New Jersey, of the South Jersey League.  The next season, he moved to Wolfenden Shore, of the Allied American Football Association; playing with them until at least March 1921 when he was on trial with Bethlehem Steel F.C. before moving to Philadelphia Hibernian of the National Soccer League of Philadelphia. He played with them from 1921 to 1922.

Professional
In 1922, McGhee signed with the New York Field Club of the American Soccer League.   He spent two seasons with New York before moving to Fleisher Yarn in 1924.  Fleisher had existed for years as an amateur powerhouse, but in 1924 the team went professional.  It was unable to maintain itself as a professional team and folded at the end of the season.  When Fleisher failed, McGhee moved to Indiana Flooring which played in New York City.  McGhee spent two seasons with Indiana.  In 1927, Charles Stoneham, owner of the New York Giants baseball team, bought Indiana Flooring.  He renamed the team the New York Nationals.  To make matters even more confusing, Stoneham renamed the team again, in 1932.  That year the original New York Giants ASL club folded.  Stoneham acquired the rights to the name and used it for his club.  McGhee played with this team, under all its names, through 1932, except for a loan period to Philadelphia Field Club during the 1928–1929 season.

In 1928, the New York Nationals won the National Challenge Cup.  In 1929, the club then won the Lewis Cup, the ASL cup competition.  Under the new name, New York Giants, the club also won the 1930–1931 ASL championship.

After 1929 ASL statistics become patchy as the Great Depression and the ASL/FIFA Soccer Wars took a toll on the league.  Despite this, McGhee played at least 350 games and scored 137 goals from 1921–1931.  According to the National Soccer Hall of Fame, "There are also reports in some publications that he later played in England for Hull City. However, he [sic] son Ed, who lives in Riverton, New Jersey, told me that, apart from his trip to South America, Bart never left the U.S."

National team
McGhee earned three caps with the U.S. national team, all coming in the 1930 FIFA World Cup.   He scored the first goal for a U.S. team in World  Cup competition in the opening victory over Belgium, which became the 2nd goal in the history of World Cups.

In 1986, the National Soccer Hall of Fame inducted McGhee.
During his ASL career Bart McGhee played in 350 league games and scored 127 goals, almost all of them from the left wing position. He was inducted into the National Soccer Hall of Fame posthumously in 1986.

International goals
United States' goal tally first

See also
List of United States men's international soccer players born outside the United States

References

External links
 htm Profile at the National Soccer Hall of Fame
 1930 World Cup team photo

1899 births
1930 FIFA World Cup players
1979 deaths
American soccer players
United States men's international soccer players
Scottish footballers
Philadelphia Hibernian players
American Soccer League (1921–1933) players
New York Field Club players
Fleisher Yarn players
Scottish emigrants to the United States
Indiana Flooring players
Philadelphia Field Club players
New York Nationals (ASL) players
New York Giants (soccer, 1930–1932) players
National Soccer Hall of Fame members
Association football forwards
Scottish expatriate sportspeople in the United States
Expatriate soccer players in the United States
Scottish expatriate footballers